Lockwood Island is an island of the Lincoln Sea, Greenland. Administratively it belongs to the Northeast Greenland National Park.

Lockwood Island is the northernmost sizeable coastal island of Greenland. The waters around the island are frozen the year round.

History
This island was named after U.S. Arctic explorer James Booth Lockwood (1852-1884). Lockwood and Sgt. David Legge Brainard achieved a new "farthest north" record of 83°23'8" on the island at the time of Greely's Lady Franklin Bay Expedition.

Geography
Lockwood Island is located at the mouth of Weyprecht Fjord, its western shore forming the eastern side of the area at the entrance of the fjord. On the eastern shore of the island  broad Conger Sound separates it from Cape Kane in Roosevelt Land in the mainland whose northernmost point is Cape Washington to the east beyond Hunt Fjord.

The waters around Lockwood Island are icebound most of the year.

See also
List of islands of Greenland
Lady Franklin Bay Expedition
Peary Land

References

External links
Ivar Haug, Gazetteer of Greenland, UBiT (Universitetsbiblioteket i Trondheim), 
Uninhabited islands of Greenland